This list of tallest buildings in Guangzhou lists skyscrapers in Guangzhou, China by height. It is also the third-tallest building in China and the seventh-tallest in the world.

Tallest buildings
This lists ranks Guangzhou skyscrapers that stand at least 150 m (492 feet) tall, based on standard height measurement. This includes spires and architectural details but does not include antenna masts. Existing structures are included for ranking purposes based on present height. The Chinese name of each building is given in Traditional Chinese.

Tallest under construction, approved, and proposed

Under construction
This lists buildings that are under construction in Guangzhou and are planned to rise at least 150 m (492 feet). Buildings that have already been topped out are also included.

* Table entries without text indicate that information regarding building heights, floor counts, and/or dates of completion has not yet been released.

Approved
This lists buildings that are approved or undergoing site preparation for construction in Guangzhou and are planned to rise at least 150 m (492 feet).

Timeline of tallest buildings
The following is a list of buildings that in the past held, or currently holds the title of the tallest building in Guangzhou. This list excludes such historic pagodas like the Flower Pagoda or Zhenhai Tower.

See also
 List of tallest buildings in China

References

General
Emporis.com - Guangzhou

Specific

External links
Diagram of Guangzhou skyscrapers on SkyscraperPage

 
Guangzhou